Jufurush (also Romanized as Jūfurūsh) is a village in Tus Rural District, in the Central District of Mashhad County, Razavi Khorasan Province, Iran. At the 2006 census, its population was 40, in 9 families.

References 

Populated places in Mashhad County